Romaria is an album by British saxophonist and composer Andy Sheppard recorded in Switzerland in 2017 and released on the ECM label the following year.

Reception

The AllMusic review by Thom Jurek notes "Sheppard's gift of restraint allows for bountiful interaction and irresisitible musicality on Romaria, making it an essential addition to his catalogue and a fine extension of Surrounded By the Sea".

All About Jazz 's reviewer Geno Thackara said, "Where so much music treats silence as an exception, Andy Sheppard's recordings find it serving more as the rule. He's never been one for weaving flashy speed runs or feeling pressure to fill space. Even when his sax lines speed up from time to time through Romaria, they serve the mood with tasteful restraint, smoothly evoking the soothing coolness of its cover ... This quartet's easy chemistry creates a pretty soundscape both inviting and intriguing, and Romaria never loses the airy feel of a cozy reverie even at its busiest".

In JazzTimes, Mac Randall wrote "Sheppard likes to keep his volume at medium-low. But although he maintains a thoroughly English reserve, there’s plenty under the surface: romance, dry wit, tenderness and, above all, a questing spirit. He’s found some wonderful colleagues to help him with his search".

Track listing
All compositions by Andy Sheppard except where noted
 "And a Day..." – 8:06
 "Thirteen" – 4:48
 "Romaria" (Renato Teixeira) – 5:11
 "Pop" – 4:21
 "They Came From the North" – 5:56
 "With Every Flower That Falls" – 5:54
 "All Becomes Again" – 7:07
 "Forever..." – 6:42

Personnel
 Andy Sheppard – tenor saxophone, soprano saxophone
 Eivind Aarset – guitar
 Michel Benita – double bass
 Sebastian Rochford – drums

References

2018 albums
Andy Sheppard albums
ECM Records albums
Albums produced by Manfred Eicher